KHDD-LP (99.3 FM) is a low-power FM radio station licensed to Oklahoma City, Oklahoma, United States. The station is currently owned by Oklahoma Catholic Family Conference, Inc.

History
The station was assigned the call sign KHDD on September 5, 2016.

References

External links
 http://www.okcr.org
 

HDD-LP
Catholic radio stations
HDD-LP
Radio stations established in 2017
2017 establishments in Oklahoma